Dorcadion arenarioides is a species of beetle in the family Cerambycidae. It was described by Rabaron in 1979. It is known from Greece.

References

arenarioides
Beetles described in 1979